Sapon is a surname. Notable people with the surname include:

Fedor Sapon (born 1993), Belarusian footballer
Mara Sapon-Shevin, American educator